Camil Bujor Mureşanu (20 April 1927 – 21 February 2015) was a Romanian historian, professor, author, and translator.

Biography 
Mureşanu was born and reared in Turda. He attended the King Ferdinand High School in Turda, where his father, Teodor Murăşanu, was a teacher. After 1946, he studied history at Cluj University, where he graduated in June 1950.

Mureşanu became a teaching assistant, junior teaching assistant (1950–1952), assistant professor (1952–1961), associate professor (1961–1975), and professor (after 1975) at Babeş-Bolyai University. Also, he was the dean of Faculty of History (1968–1976, 1981–1989). He obtain his Ph.D. in history in 1971 with the thesis: Times of John Hunyadi (doctoral adviser Ṣtefan Pascu). He was visiting professor at Columbia University, New York City (1978). Mureşanu is a doctoral adviser after 1976. In the summer of 1948, Camil Mureşanu was arrested for political reasons, without penal sanctions.

He is a researcher at the "George Bariţiu" History Institute (after 1975). In 1995, he became the principal of "George Bariţiu" History Institute. He was a corresponding member of the Romanian Academy (1990), then member of the Romanian Academy – the History and Archaeology Section (June 2000) and branch chairman of Cluj Romanian Academy (after 2006). Officially, his surname was "Mureşan", but he prefers in the last years "Mureşanu".

He was a participant at the International Congress of Historical Sciences (Vienna – 1965, Moscow – 1970, Bucharest – 1980, Oslo – 2000). He attended a specialisation at Sorbonne University in Paris (February – June 1966).

He is a correspondent member of the "Süd-ost Europa Gesellschaft", Munich (October 1999), and Berlin (February 26, 2000), as well as a correspondent member of the Pedagogical Academy in Belgrade. He is the co-president of the Romanian-Hungarian mixed history commission.

Camil Mureşanu is a doctor honoris causa of the University of Oradea (December 1, 1999), the West University of Timişoara (March 2002), and the 1 Decembrie 1918 University, Alba Iulia (March 2007).

He is an honorary citizen of Cluj-Napoca (February 1997), Turda (June 1997), and Blaj (September 24, 1999).

He is a member of General Association of Greek Catholic Romanians.

Family 
His grandfather was a priest and his father, Teodor Murăşanu, was a Romanian language teacher.

His son, Ovidiu Mureşan (born 1951), is a historian at Babeş-Bolyai University.

Awards 
 Award of the Romanian Academy (1976) 
 The Government of Romania awarded him The National Order for Merit in the rank of officer.

Works 
John Hunyadi. Defender of Christendom. Iaşi – Oxford – Portland, The Center for Romanian Studies, 2001, 224 p. 
Ioan de Hunedoara şi vremea sa, București, Editura Tineretului, 1957, 203 p. 
Revoluţia burgheză din Anglia, București 1964,
Erdély története, vol. 2, București 1964, [în colab.],
Monumente istorice din Turda,  București 1968,
Beziehungen zwischen der rumänischen und sächsischer Forschung im 19. und 20. Jahrhundert, în: Wege landeskundlicher Forschung, Köln-Wien 1988 Siebenbürgisches Archiv, Bd. 21
Naţiune, naţionalism. Evoluţia naţionalităţilor, Centrul de Studii Transilvane, Cluj 1996,
Focul ocrotit de ape (Revoluţia burgheză din Ţările de Jos). București, Editura Ştiinţifică, 1960, 179 p. 
Din istoria Transilvaniei. Vol 2. București, Editura Academiei, 1961, 462 p.; Ediţia a 2‑a în 1963, 550 p. [În colab.]. 
Lecturi din izvoarele istoriei evului mediu. București, Editura de Stat Didactică si Pedagogică, 1961, 281 p. [În colab.]. 
Istoria României. Vol. 2. București, Editura Academiei, 1962, 1259 p. [În colab.]. 
Erdély története. Vol. 2. București, Editura Academiei, 1964, 558 p. [În colab.]. 
Istoria României. Vol. 4. București, Editura Academiei, 1964, 861 p. [În colab.]. 
Revoluţia burgheză din Anglia. București, Editura Ştiinţifică, 1964, 341 p. 
Imperiul Britanic. Scurtă istorie. București, Editura Ştiinţifică, 1967, 502 p. 
Iancu de Hunedoara. Ed. a 2‑a revăzută şi adăugită. București, Editura Ştiinţifică, 1968, 245 p. 
Monumente istorice din Turda București, Editura Meridiane, 1968, 32 p. 
Atlas istoric. Coordonator Ştefan Pascu. București, Editura Didactică şi Pedagogică, 1971, 199 p. [În colab.]. 
Culegere de texte pentru istorie universală. Epoca modernă. Vol. l: 1640‑1848. București, Editura Didactică şi Pedagogică, 1973, 360 p. [În colab.]. 
Culegere de texte pentru istorie universală. Epoca modernă. Vol. 2 : 1848‑1918. București, Editura Didactică şi Pedagogică, 1974, 350 p. [În colab.]. 
Preşedinte la Casa Albă. București, Editura Politică, 1974, 699 p. [În colab.]. 
Iancu de Hunedoara. București, Editura Militară, 1976, 128 p. 
Atlas pentru istoria României. București, Editura Didactică şi Pedagogică, 1983, 30 p. + 84 h. + 12 pl. + 26 p. index. [În colab.]. 
Simon Bolivar (1783‑1830). București, Editura Politică, 1983, 135 p. 
Downing Street 10. Cluj‑Napoca, "Dacia", 1984, 401 p. [În colab.]. 
Istoria militară a poporului român. Vol. 2. Epoca de glorie a oastei celei mari. A doua jumătate a secolului al XlV‑lea – prima jumătate a secolului al XVI‑lea. București, Editura Militară, 1986, 638 p. [În colab.]. 
Istoria militară a poporului român. Vol. 4. Epoca revoluţiilor de eliberare naţională şi socială. De la revoluţia populară din 1784 la cucerirea independenţei depline 1877‑1878. București, Editura Militară, 1987, XII, +1105 p. [În colab.]. 
Bezichungen zwischen der rumänischen und sächsischer Forschung im 19. und 20. Jahrhundert, in Wege landeakundlicher Forschung. Köln und Wien, Böhlau Verlag, 1988, p. 277‑288. (Siebenbürgischen Archiv, Bd. 21). 
Documente privind revoluţia de la 1848 în Ţările Române. C. Transilvania. Vol. 4 : 14‑25 mai 1848. București, Editura Academiei, 1988, XLVIII+ 599 p. 
Preşedinţii Franţei. Craiova, Universalia Dialog, 1991, 231 p. [În colab.]. 
Momente din istoria Europei. Cluj-Napoca, Universitatea "Babeş-Bolyai", 1996, 293 p. 
Naţiune, naţionalism. Evoluţia naţionalităţilor. Cluj‑Napoca, Centrul de Studii Transilvane. Fundaţia Culturală Română, 1996, 308 p. 
Vieţi, fapte, gânduri. Craiova, Editura OMNISCOP, [1996], 198 p. 
Europa modernă. De la Renaştere la sfârşitul de mileniu. Cluj‑Napoca, Editura Dacia, 1997, 126 p. 
Transilvania între medieval şi modern. Vol. 1–2. Coordonator ..., Cluj‑Napoca, 1996, 160 p.; 1997, 48 p. 
Revoluţia de la 1848–1849 în Europa Centrală. Perspectivă istorică şi istoriografică. Coordonatori: Camil Mureşanu, Nicolae Bocşan, Ioan Bolovan, Cluj‑Napoca, Editura Presa Universitară Clujeană, 2000, 472 p. 
Istoria românilor. Vol. 4. De la universalitatea creştină către Europa "patriilor". Comitetul de redacţie al volumului: acad. Ştefan Ştefănescu şi acad. Camil Mureşanu, redactori responsabili, prof. univ. Tudor Teoteoi, secretary, București, Editura Enciclopedică, 2001, 878 p. + pl. + il. [Author al paginilor: 31–54; 338–348; 502–524]. 
Istorie şi cunoaştere. Discurs de recepţie la Academia Română, București, Editura Academiei Române, 2002, 20 p.; În: Academica, 2001, 12, nr. 1–2, p. 30-31; MI, 2002, 36, nr. 2, p. 33–38. 
În templul lui Ianus. Studii şi gânduri despre trecut şi viitor. Cluj‑Napoca, Editura Cartimpex, 2002, 345 p. 
Documenta Romaniae Historica. Series C. Transilvania. Vol. XIV: 1371‑1375. Editura Academiei Române, 2002, 815 p. [Editor] 
Publilius Syrus, Maxime.  Text original, traducere din limba latină şi note de ..., Cluj-Napoca, Editura Cartimpex, 2002, 104 p. 
Ioan Lupaş, Scrieri istorice alese. Vol. 2. Studii privind istoria modernă şi istoria istoriografiei. Ediţie îngrijită de..., București, Editura Academiei Române, 2007, 525 p.

Doctoral advisor 
 Ovidiu Achim, Rolul Tribunei şi tribunismului în mişcarea naţională şi culturală ardelenă la sfârşitul secolului al XIX-lea (1995) 
 Minerva Lovin, Emigraţia românească din Transilvania în Canada în 1920 (1997) 
 Teodora Daniela Sechel, Politica sanitară promovată de Habsburgi în Transilvania între 1740–1835. Disciplina socială impusă de authorităţi ca oconsecinţă an acestei politici de reformă (1999) 
 Demetra Marica Gui, Interferenţe franceze în pictura modernă românească (de la Grigorescu la Tonitza) (2002) 
 Daciana Marinescu, Interferenţe în evoluţia învăţământului pedagogic şi teologic Arădean (1812–1877) (2002)
 Ovidiu Munteanu, Imaginea poporului român şi a Ţărilor Române în mediul cultural-politic francez 1829–1859 (2002)
 Cosmin Lucian Seman, Ioan Micu Moldovan (1833–1915). Monografie istorica. (2004) 
 Vasile Florin Mirgheşiu, Vasile Stoica - gânditor politic şi diplomat (2004)

On-line works 
 http://www.history-cluj.ro/Istorie/cercet/Muresanu/In%20templul%20lui%20Janus.pdf
 http://www.history-cluj.ro/Istorie/cercet/Muresanu/maxime2r.htm

References 

 Naţiune şi europenitate. Studii istorice. In honorem magisti Camilli Mureşanu, București, Editura Academiei Române, 2007, XXXV + 467 p. 
 Professor Camil Mureşanu at His 75th Anniversary (Cluj, 1997) 
 Bio-Bibliography of Prof. Dr. Camil Muresanu, member-correspondent of the Romanian Academy, on the occasion of his 70th anniversary. Introduction by Nicolae Edroiu. The bibliography of Prof. Dr. Camil Muresanu's work, (1955–1997) written by Maria Pagu and Karolyi Iolanda, Cluj-Napoca, 1997, 68 p.
 Cristian Colceriu, Nobletea profesiei- Functia integratoare a istoricului, in Elite Clujene Contemporane Cluj Contemporary Elites, Academia Romana- Centrul de Studii Transilvane, vol.I, Ed. Clear Vison, Cluj Napoca, 2009

Romanian political scientists
Academic staff of Babeș-Bolyai University
People from Turda
Romanian essayists
Romanian schoolteachers
1927 births
2015 deaths
Romanian Greek-Catholics
Romanian biographers
Male biographers
Romanian textbook writers
20th-century Romanian historians
Romanian journalists
Romanian memoirists
Romanian civil servants
Romanian activists
Romanian anthropologists
Romanian Christian pacifists
Romanian literary critics
Romanian magazine editors
Romanian philologists
Romanian political philosophers
Romanian philanthropists
Romanian translators
Titular members of the Romanian Academy
Social philosophers
20th-century translators
Male essayists
20th-century essayists
20th-century Romanian male writers
20th-century philanthropists